Line 4 is a line of Suzhou Rail Transit. It runs in a north-south alignment from Longdaobang station in Xiangcheng District's the northern suburbs, to the canal town of Tongli in Wujiang District in the south and Muli in the southwest. The line is 52.8 km long with 38 stations, which consists of a 41.5 kilometer long main line with 30 stations and a branch line.

History
Groundbreaking occurred on December 31, 2010 in Wujiang, and the line was constructed between 2012 and 2016. Operations started on April 15, 2017.

Opening timeline

Stations

Rolling stock
Trains are run in six-car formations, and have a maximum speed of 80 km/h.

Notes

References

Suzhou Rail Transit lines
Railway lines opened in 2017